The 1991 Speedway World Team Cup was the 32nd edition of the FIM Speedway World Team Cup to determine the team world champions.

The final was staged at Vojens Speedway Center, Denmark and the host nation Denmark won a ninth title, once again drawing level with England's record. It was also Hans Nielsen's ninth gold medal having taken part in all of Denmark's title wins from 1978 until 1991.

Qualification

Group D
 April 22, 1991
  Leipzig
 ROUND 1

 April 28, 1991
  Krsko
 ROUND 2

Yugoslavia to Group C.

Group C

 May 19, 1991
  Lonigo
 ROUND 1

 May 26, 1991
  Tarnów
 ROUND 2

Norway to Group B.

Group B

 July 7, 1991
  Diedenbergen
 ROUND 1

 July 14, 1991
  Debrecen
 ROUND 2

Hungary to Group A.

Group A

 August 24, 1991
  Pardubice

Sweden to Final.

World Final
 September 14, 1991
  Vojens, Speedway Center

See also
 1991 Individual Speedway World Championship
 1991 Speedway World Pairs Championship

References

Speedway World Team Cup
1991 in speedway